Gabrje is a settlement in the Municipality of Tolmin in the Littoral region of Slovenia.

Geography
Gabrje stands along the road from Tolmin to Kobarid on the left bank of the Soča River at the foot of Mount Vodel and Cold Peak, which is also the highest point in the territory of the village. In addition to the main settlement of Gabrje, the village includes the hamlets of V Grapi to the southeast and Na Pesku to the northwest. The slopes above the village are forested, and there are tilled fields and meadows on the remnants of terraces along the river.

References

External links 
Gabrje on Geopedia

Populated places in the Municipality of Tolmin